Kozinka is a rural locality (a selo) in Prishibinsky Selsoviet of Yenotayevsky District, Astrakhan Oblast, Russia. The population was 11 as of 2010. There is 1 street.

Geography 
Kozinka is located 82 km northwest of Yenotayevka (the district's administrative centre) by road.

References 

Rural localities in Yenotayevsky District